The British Dam Society was established in London, UK, in 1965 and is a learned 'Associated Society' of the Institution of Civil Engineers and a registered charity in England and Wales (No. 1113476).

BDS aims to advance public and professional understanding of technical subjects relating to the planning, design, construction, maintenance, operation, safety, environmental and social issues that are involved with dams and reservoir projects. It holds a biennial conference and lecture (the Geoffrey Binnie Lecture), publishes a journal Dams & Reservoirs, and acts as the United Kingdom national committee of ICOLD.

It also provides expert commentary on dam-related safety issues; for example, in 2012, it expressed concern to Defra about the timetable for the registration, inspection and risk assessment of UK reservoirs.

References

External links

Dams in the United Kingdom
Professional associations based in the United Kingdom
1965 establishments in the United Kingdom
Organizations established in 1965